The 2006 Danvers Chemical fire took place at approximately 2:46 AM EST on Wednesday, November 22, 2006. An explosion occurred at the plant of solvent and ink manufacturer CAI Inc., located in the Danversport area of Danvers, Massachusetts, which it shared with paint manufacturer Arnel. Arnel ceased operations after the blast.

Cause
A May 13, 2008 report from the U.S. Chemical Safety and Hazard Investigation Board attributed the explosion to unintentional overnight heating of an ink-mixing tank containing flammable solvents.

Damage

The explosion damaged over 90 homes, blowing out windows and knocking some houses off their foundations.  Officials believed that some of the more extensively damaged houses would have to be leveled and rebuilt.  Some of the buildings damaged included a bakery, boats at a nearby marina, and the New England Home for the Deaf, an assisted-living facility for people who are deaf or deafblind and elderly residents requiring constant care.  "These people are extremely fragile," said state Rep. Ted Speliotis, D-Danvers, whose district includes the affected area.  "Many of them have Alzheimer's and other illnesses.  It's clear they can't stay here long, but it's clear they won't be able to return for quite a while."

Danvers Fire Chief James P. Tutko toured the area by helicopter and said many residents would be kept from their homes for the foreseeable future.  "It looks like a war zone, that's the only thing I can say" Tutko said. Fortunately, no one was killed.  "Somebody out there likes us", Tutko commented.  Finally, he said that determining the cause of the explosion would take days.

Outgoing governor Mitt Romney toured the area and said the explosion was a "Thanksgiving miracle", as the explosion was "equivalent to a  bomb going off in a residential neighborhood," and that no one was killed.  In an area that included over 300 residents, just 10 people reported minor injuries.  Residents of the area were evacuated to the Danvers High School, where temporary shelter was set up by the American Red Cross of Massachusetts Bay.  Donations were taken for residents affected by the explosion.  Residents were also advised to start filing insurance claims right away and to keep track of their expenses.

Environmental impact
There were minor environmental concerns due to water runoff of chemicals.  According to the Environmental Protection Agency's on-scene coordinator Mike Nalipinski, preliminary tests showed low levels of toluene, a solvent, but said it was insignificant.  Water runoff from the water used by firefighters left a purple sheen on the river and tests were conducted.  However, the water is not a local drinking water supply, and the chemical evaporates quickly.  Chief Tutko said there was no risk of toxic fumes getting into the air.

An Eastern Propane facility is located near the area, however, it was not the source of the explosion.  A spokesman for the company said that although the property suffered some minor damage, their tanks are secure.

According to WHDH television, a person who answered the telephone at CAI's Georgetown, Massachusetts headquarters refused comment, and a telephone message left at the company president's home was not returned.

References

Explosions in 2006
Danvers, Massachusetts
Fires in Massachusetts
Industrial fires
Events in Essex County, Massachusetts
2006 industrial disasters
2006 in Massachusetts
Chemical plant explosions
Explosions in Massachusetts
Industrial fires and explosions in the United States
2006 fires in the United States